Sarab-e Bardeh Zanjir-e Sofla (also Romanized as Sarāb-e Bardeh Zanjīr-e Soflá; also known as Sarāb-e Bard Zanjīr, Sarāb-e Bard Zanjīr-e Soflá, and Sarāb-e Zanjīr) is a village in Bazan Rural District, in the Central District of Javanrud County, Kermanshah Province, Iran. At the 2006 census, its population was 196, in 43 families.

References 

Populated places in Javanrud County